Cristin Clark is an American curler.

At the international level, she curled for the United States at three World Mixed Doubles Curling Championships and one World Mixed Curling Championship.

At the national level, she is a ten-time United States mixed champion curler and a three-time United States mixed doubles champion curler. Her women's team was the USA Curling Team of the Year in 2009 and 2012.

Private life
Clark's husband is fellow curler Brady Clark; together, they won the United States Mixed Championship ten times and the United States Mixed Doubles Championship three times. They have one son, Sean.

Teams

Women's

Mixed

Mixed doubles

References

External links

Living people

People from Lynnwood, Washington
American female curlers
American curling champions
Sportspeople from the Seattle metropolitan area
Year of birth missing (living people)
21st-century American women